Almondo Alfonzo Curry (born August 18, 1980) is a former cornerback in the Canadian Football League. As of 2006, he was unsigned.

Curry was originally signed as a free agent by the Montreal Alouettes in 2004.  He was traded to Saskatchewan Roughriders in 2006 for quarterback, Nealon Greene. Curry was named to the CFL All-Star team in 2004. In college, he played for the University of Virginia. He is a cousin of former Oakland Raiders wide receiver Ronald Curry.

References

Montreal Alouettes players
Saskatchewan Roughriders players
Sportspeople from Hampton, Virginia
1980 births
Living people
Canadian football defensive backs
Virginia Cavaliers football players
American players of Canadian football
Canadian Football League Rookie of the Year Award winners